Samuel Ritter Peters (August 16, 1842 – April 21, 1910) was a U.S. Representative from Kansas.

Born in Walnut Township, near Circleville, Ohio, Peters attended the common schools and the Ohio Wesleyan University at Delaware. Enlisted in the Union Army as a private in Company E, Seventy-third Regiment, Ohio Volunteer Infantry, in October 1861 and was mustered out in June 1865, having held successively the ranks of sergeant, second lieutenant, first lieutenant, and captain. He was graduated in law from the University of Michigan at Ann Arbor in 1867. He was admitted to the bar the same year and commenced practice in Memphis, Missouri. He was editor of the Memphis Reveille from 1868 to 1873. He served as delegate to the Republican National Convention in 1872. He served as mayor of Memphis in 1873. He moved to Marion, Kansas, in 1873 and resumed the practice of law.

Peters was elected a member of the Kansas State Senate in 1874 and served until his resignation in March 1875. He was appointed and subsequently elected judge of the ninth judicial district and served from 1875 until 1883, when he resigned. He moved to Newton, Kansas, in 1876.

Peters was elected as a Republican to the Forty-eighth and to the three succeeding Congresses (March 4, 1883 – March 3, 1891). He was not a candidate for renomination in 1890. He resumed the practice of law in Newton. He served as member of the board of managers of the State reformatory 1895-1899. Postmaster of Newton 1898-1910. He was editor of the Newton Daily Kansas-Republican in 1899. He died in Newton, Kansas on April 21, 1910. He was interred in Greenwood Cemetery.

References

1842 births
1910 deaths
People from Pickaway County, Ohio
Kansas state court judges
Republican Party Kansas state senators
People from Marion, Kansas
Union Army officers
University of Michigan Law School alumni
Republican Party members of the United States House of Representatives from Kansas
19th-century American politicians
People from Memphis, Missouri
People from Newton, Kansas
19th-century American judges